Hans Widmer (1929 – 2002) was a Swiss breaststroke swimmer. He competed in the men's 200 metre breaststroke at the 1948 Summer Olympics.

References

External links
 

1929 births
2002 deaths
Olympic swimmers of Switzerland
Swimmers at the 1948 Summer Olympics
Place of birth missing
Swiss male breaststroke swimmers
20th-century Swiss people